Ahmad Badreddin Hassoun (born 25 April 1949) was the Grand Mufti of Syria from 2005 to 2021, after which the post was abolished.

Biography
Ahmad Badr al-Din Hassun was born in Aleppo, Syria. His father, Muhammad Adib Hassun (1913–2008), was also a sheikh. He has five children and ten grandchildren. Hassoun studied at the University of Islamic Studies, where he graduated as Doctor in Shafi'i fiqh. Hassoun took office as Grand Mufti of Syria in July 2005 after the death of Ahmed Kuftaro. Hassoun is a frequent speaker in interreligious and intercultural events, and his pluralistic views on interfaith dialogue (between different religions or between different Islamic denominations) have sparked criticism from stricter visions of Islam.

Interfaith dialogue
On September 6, 2006, Hassoun met the Armenian Foreign Minister, Vartan Oskanian, to discuss the relationship between the two nations, as well as the two religions, among other issues. In the same travel he met the Catholicos of All Armenians.

On January 15, 2008, Hassoun spoke to the European Parliament on the subject of intercultural dialogue, stressing the value of culture as a unifying rather than a dividing force. Hassoun was addressing a formal sitting of Parliament as the first speaker in a series of visits by eminent religious and cultural leaders in 2008, which had been designated the European Year of Intercultural Dialogue. He made the statement "Abraham, Moses, Jesus and Mohamed came with one single religion", therefore "there is no holy war, because a war can never be holy: it is peace that is holy"; later he added that it is wrong to use religion to justify killing.

Hassoun's 22-year-old son, Sariya, was assassinated on October 2, 2011, in an ambush on the road between Idlib and Aleppo.

Syrian Civil War 

Hassoun is considered to be a firm supporter of Syrian President Bashar al-Assad. In a public address which aired on Syrian News Channel and was posted on the Internet on 9 October 2011 (as translated by Enab Baladi), Hassoun threatened Europe and the United States if Syria was attacked by external powers, stating that: "The moment the first missile hits Syria, all the sons and daughters of Lebanon and Syria will set out to become martyrdom-seekers in Europe and on Palestinian soil. I say to all of Europe and to the US: We will prepare martyrdom-seekers who are already among you. If you bomb Syria or Lebanon, it will be an eye for an eye and a tooth for a tooth."
   
Following the broadcasting of this speech, the Foundation for Middle East Peace withdrew an invitation to Hassoun to speak at the "Coexistence and Dialogue" conference. Foundation president Philip Wilcox stated that "We were not aware of his speech, which was at odds with the theme of the event."

In 2016, it was reported by Amnesty International that Hassoun was one of three men who had been deputised by Syrian President Bashar al-Assad with the power to sign execution warrants for prisoners at Sednaya prison.

Der Spiegel interview
Hassoun was interviewed by the German magazine Der Spiegel on 8 November 2011, saying that some of the protestors in Syria were armed Islamist rebels backed by Saudi Arabia. He talked about religion and politics in Syria during the revolution:
But then imams who had come from abroad, especially Saudi Arabia, stirred things up with their inflammatory speeches. The news channels stationed in the Gulf states, Al-Jazeera and Al-Arabiya, helped them by falsely claiming that the clergy was on the side of the anti-Assad protesters.", "And what has really improved in Egypt? Should we welcome the rise of Islamist parties? I believe in the strict separation of church and state."
"How many, 50 or 55? We're talking about an army of tens of thousands of men. But some of the radical Sunni imams from Saudi Arabia and the Gulf region are stirring people up, and unfortunately they are finding a few Sunni imams in my country who sympathize with them. For instance, they have pronounced a fatwa against me, because in their view I am betraying religion and am too moderate. But I'm not the only one on their hit list."
"They set their sights on my innocent son Saria, a 22-year-old student who was always friendly to everyone, who was studying International Relations and did not want to make religion his profession. So much for the kin liability you've criticized elsewhere! Oh, if only the four killers had killed me instead.", 
"There are close ties between the Saudi royal family and the American White House. The Americans are often on the side of the oppressors. I am always on the side of the oppressed." 
"I see myself as the grand mufti of all 23 million Syrians, not just Muslims, but also Christians and even atheists. I am a man of dialogue. Who knows, maybe an agnostic will convince me with better arguments one day, and I'll become a non-believer. And if I'm enthusiastic about the opposition's political platform, I also might change sides.

See also 
 2016 international conference on Sunni Islam in Grozny

References

External links
 Official Facebook profile

1949 births
Living people
Syrian imams
People from Aleppo
Syrian Sunni Muslims
Grand Muftis of Syria